Handa (written:  or ) is a Japanese surname. Notable people with the surname include:

, Japanese Go player
, Japanese women's footballer
Haruhisa Handa (半田 晴久, born 1951, also known as Toshu Fukami), Japanese religious leader and businessman 
, Japanese basketball player
, Japanese actor
, Japanese footballer
, Japanese footballer
, Japanese naval aviator and World War II flying ace
, Japanese footballer
, Japanese volleyball player

Fictional characters
, a character in the manga series Shōjo Sect
, a character in the manga series Barakamon

Japanese-language surnames